Gangbusters was a historical roleplaying game designed by Rick Krebs (based on his original game called "Bloody 20's") with Mark Acres assisting in its development. The game was published by TSR, Inc. Two editions of the game were published. The first edition of the game was published in 1982.

Gangbusters is a game about crime in the United States during the 1920s and 1930s.  Players take the roles of criminals, law enforcement professionals, or other characters (such as newspaper reporters) who investigate or oppose criminals.  An emphasis is placed on the violent growth of organized crime during Prohibition. Political corruption is also a recurring theme.

Setting
Gangbusters was inspired by both historical figures (such as Al Capone) and fictional accounts of the era.  Films were an especially strong influence; the game's bibliography lists dozens of movies for inspiration, ranging from The Big House to The Untouchables.

The default location for Gangbusters campaigns is Lakefront City, a fictional metropolis located (in an unspecified state) on the western shore of Lake Michigan, probably Chicago.  A basic description of the city is included in the Gangbusters rules, and expanded upon in the five  adventures published for the game.

System
Character generation in Gangbusters follows a pattern common in role-playing games of the early 1980s—a player randomly generates his character's abilities (such as Muscle and Luck) using dice, then chooses a career (character class) for the character.  Careers for player characters are limited to Criminal, FBI Agent, Newspaper Reporter, Police Officer, Private Investigator, and Prohibition Agent.  Each career includes a unique set of advantages and disadvantages to differentiate it from the others.  Characters are further customized by adding non-career skills, such as Auto Theft or Photography.

Characters are improved by earning experience points.  Experience points are awarded (by the gamemaster, called the Judge in Gangbusters) based on a character's success in his career.  For example, criminals earn experience points based on how profitable their crimes are, while police officers earn experience points for capturing criminals.  Earning experience points increases a character's level (which is an indicator of social status in the game setting), and allows the character's player to improve the character's abilities and purchase new skills.

Gangbusters uses a percentile-based mechanic for most task resolutions.  The basic chances of a character succeeding at an action are equal to the character's score in a relevant ability or skill, subject to modifiers assigned by the Judge.  The player of that character then rolls percentile dice to determine if the character succeeded.  The results of actions (such as the damage caused by weapons or the amount of money produced by a criminal enterprise) may be determined by further dice rolls.  All dice rolls in the game use ten-sided dice.

History

The first edition of Gangbusters, published in 1982, used the boxed game format typical for TSR Hobbies games in the 1980s.  In addition to the 64-page rule book, the box contained a 16-page adventure, a game map (representing several blocks of Lakefront City), a sheet of cardboard counters (representing characters and vehicles), and two dice. (Rolston 1983)

Between 1982 and 1984, TSR published five adventure modules for Gangbusters.  In order, they were:

 Trouble Brewing by Tom Moldvay
 Murder in Harmony by Mark Acres
 Death on the Docks by Mark Acres
 The Vanishing Investigator by Tracy Hickman
 Death in Spades by Tracy Hickman

Three packs of Gangbusters miniatures were also produced by TSR. 

In 1990, TSR, Inc. released a second edition of the Gangbusters rules, but mislabeled it as a "New 3rd Edition".  The 3rd Edition (as it came to be known) is a 128-page softcover book combining the text of the first edition rule book with information taken from the adventures Trouble Brewing, Murder in Harmony and Death on The Docks.  Except for minor edits, the 3rd Edition Gangbusters game mechanics are indistinguishable from those of the original edition.

In 2019, Mark Hunt, with permission of original designer Rick Krebs, released an updated and simplified "B/X" version of the rules based on the game mechanics of the widely popular 1980 Dungeons & Dragons basic and expert sets.

Reception
In a retrospective review of Gangbusters in Black Gate, Ty Johnston said "If you're looking to try something different at your gaming table but don't want the hassle of having to learn the rules for a long, complicated system, you should check out one of the versions of Gangbusters. I predict you'll have a blast."

Review
Dragon #76
Different Worlds #29 (June, 1983)
Jeux & Stratégie #19

References

 Pope, Thomas.  TSR: Gangbusters
 Rolston, Ken. "Expanding the genre of RPGs", Dragon 76 (Dragon Publishing, 1983).
 Swan, Rick. The Complete Guide to Role-Playing Games (St Martin Press, 1990).

Historical role-playing games
TSR, Inc. games
Role-playing games introduced in 1982
Pulp and noir period role-playing games